Cheick Seynou (born 1967) is a Burkinabé athlete. He competed in the men's high jump at the 1988 Summer Olympics.

References

External links
 

1961 births
Living people
Athletes (track and field) at the 1988 Summer Olympics
Burkinabé male high jumpers
Olympic athletes of Burkina Faso
Place of birth missing (living people)
21st-century Burkinabé people